Tartu Jalgpalliklubi Welco is a semi-professional football club based in Tartu, Estonia. The club was founded in 2008 when group of university students decided to participate in IV liiga South, which is 6th and also the lowest tier of Estonian football pyramid. The first team of JK Welco currently plays in Esiliiga, after the promotion to the higher level through play-offs in 2016. Club also have reserve team in II Liiga and men and women amateur teams in lower tiers of Estonian football pyramid. The club is famous for their supporter group Electric Legion which is one of the biggest and most vocal supporter groups in Estonian club football scene.

History

Prologue
History of the club begins a year before the official founding of Tartu JK Welco Elekter when group of football enthusiasts, led by charismatic first captain of the team and eternal head coach Mirko Kikkamägi, gathered under the name JK Masuudinaine to compete in local Tartu football championship in November 2007. After not-so-successful debut in the competition, the team decided to try their luck in Estonian football championship and registered the team as JK Welco Elekter to play in IV Liiga South. New name was given by OÜ Welco Elekter – a local electricity company, which became the name sponsor of the club. In the first season, JK Welco Elekter squad was mainly completed of inexperienced players, a rare contrast was trequartista Mikk Valtna, a former Tartu JK Tammeka player who had previously for a single game capped for Meistriliiga side.

Season 2008
The club's debut season was difficult due to squad problems and lack of organizational know-how, so JK Welco Elekter finished its first season in IV Liiga South with 21 points from 22 games and with nondescript 9th place. Also, the Estonian Small Cup was unsuccessful when the club advanced only to 2nd round. JK Welco Elekter won its first trophy in annual Estonian Football Association End of Year tournament when the club was 3rd. Mikk Valtna was named MVP of the tournament

Season 2009
In the second season, the team was much more experienced and experimental strategies of young football mastermind, head coach Mirko Kikkamägi, started to succeed. Addition of a future long-time team capten, Timo Kuus, who had previously also played for Meistriliiga side Tartu JK Tammeka, to the team, made the defensive line much more confident and improved the team's performances. JK Welco Elekter finished the season with 11 wins and 35 points in 20 games and 3rd place in the league. The team advanced to play-off round to play for promotion to III Liiga, where JK Koeru beat JK Welco Elekter with aggregate score of 1–6. Estonian Small Cup proved to be much more successful and the team advanced to 1/4-finals, where III Liiga side Tallinna JK Piraaja beat JK Welco Elekter 0–3.

Season 2010
Season 2010 saw many organizational and squad changes, most notably an addition of experienced head coach Boris Hrabrov, who took over the head coaching position. Eldar Rassulov and Sergei Ottšik, both with years of Estonian Meistriliiga experience, were most important additions to the squad. The club chairman position was taken over by right-back Priit Raamat. In the 2010, JK Welco Elekter managed to finish the season 2nd in the league, which ensured the club's promotion to III Liiga. Welco finished the season with 52 points from 20 games and astonishing 100 goals. Mikk Valtna scored 35 goals in the league and was the top scorer in whole Estonian football system in 2011.
Estonian Cup and Estonian Small Cup were both unsuccessful to the club, but End of Year tournament brought second 3rd-place trophy to Welco.

Season 2011
Welco debut season in III Liiga South proved to be quite difficult for the team. Addition of experienced centre-back Juri Avdonin and former member of Estonian youth national team, winger Marti Pähn, gave the squad much needed depth, but Welco still struggled to find the back of the net in the 1st round, with star striker Mikk Valtna abroad. The club improved the performances in 2nd round and eventually finished the season with 4th place.
Estonian Cup was a success for the team, since Welco advanced to 1/16-final and just narrowly missed the target, by losing away to Meistriliiga side FC Kuressaare 1–2. End of Year tournament gave yet another 3rd-place trophy to the team.

Season 2012
The season 2012, which marks an anniversary 5th season of the club, proved to be very difficult. The team saw the departure of beloved lean mean goal machine Mikk Valtna, who joined inner-town rivals -Meistriliiga side JK Tammeka Tartu. Also infamous midfield fighter Eldar Rassulov was unable to help the team in the first round. Additionally, squad problems occurred due to the fact that for the first time its history, club had to find players for two teams. All things considered, spring round was unsuccessful for the team and club's chair decided to part ways with head coach Boris Hrabrov. Debutant head coach Mikk Valtna took over the job and squad's performances started to improve. The return of Rassulov and addition of former Estonian u-14 youth national team player Marten Kihho helped to achieve 5th place in the league at the end of season. Both, the Estonian Small Cup and Estonian cup were unsuccessful – the team failed to record a win in cup competitions in 2012. The End of Year tournament brought a traditional 3rd place to the team.

Season 2013
In the wake of the 2013, Welco's chair decided to take the challenge offered by the Estonian Football Association. Due to the reforms to the Estonian football league system, Welco had an opportunity to join the II Liiga. Welco decided to take on the challenge, though this meant that the season will be difficult. The management made a considerable amount of additions to the squad and the depth of the roster proved to be vital for the success for the team. In the league, Welco was constantly in the relegation zone, but due to the strong finish to the season, electricians managed to finish on the 11th spot, just out of the relegation.
The Estonian Small Cup was much more successful to the team then on the previous seasons – team advanced to the 1/4 finals, but the team could not improve its best accomplishment in the competition and were held down by Saue JK 2–3. Also, the Estonian Cup was a huge success for the club – team advanced to 1/8-final and missed further stage of the competition by only the narrowest of margins – Esiliiga side FC Puuma defeated Welco in front Tartu home crowd 4–3.

Season 2014
Season 2014 started with high ambitions – new off-season acquisitions Erki Kade, former Estonian U19 national team winger Siim Sillaots and Siim Kaasik from the in-town rivals Tartu SK 10 gave the electricians starting 11 a level of quality that proved to be enough to play for the highest places in the league. Also, some changes were made on the coaching staff – after a successful debut season as the head coach of Welco's reserves, the club chair decided to share the head coaching position between the Valtna brothers, bringing former Welco II coach Siim to the first team coaching staff. The season ended with 3rd place – and the team just missed the opportunity to play for the promotion to Esiliiga B.
The team could not mirror the success in 2014–15 Estonian Cup nor in Estonian Small Cup – both competitions ended for Welco in the 1st round.

Season 2015
In the wake of 2015 season, the general assembly of MTÜ JK Welco decided to take a bold move and following the decision, all three teams managed by MTÜ JK Welco are competing under new name – Tartu JK Welco. Significant changes were done to coaching stuff and  Siim Valtna took over as lone head coach, while his brother Mikk came back home and joined the proud Black-White Army on the field where he was given the privilege to be el capitan once again. Additionally, strong and experienced centre-back Lehar The Terminator Savikink and nimble target-man Hannes Tiru from FC Levadia joined the ranks and improved the quality of the team.

The season, ended with 2nd place and Welco played for promotion to Esiliiga B. In the first leg Welco won Tallinna FC Puuma 5–0 and although in the second leg the team had to face 0–2 loss, Welco ensured a place in Esiliiga B.

In 2015–16 Estonian Cup Welco made it to 1/16-final where the team faced Premium League team FC Flora. The game was played in Welco's homecourt in front of 747 spectators which set the record for recent years in Tartu – it was also Welco's record for home crowd. Welco lost the game to Flora 0–2. In Estonian Small Cup Welco made it to quarterfinal where FC Merkuur defeated Welco 4–1.

Season 2016
The first season in the top leagues of Estonian football pyramid was a challenge for the club, since it brought more games, higher playing level and requirements for the organization. The team coped surprisingly well with higher league – with much help from new signings of Kristofer Reinberg, Hendrik Vellama and Kaarel Torop – and finished season on a third place which granted the team a play-off round for a place in Esiliiga against Nõmme Kalju FC U21 team.

Although Welco lost the first game at home 2:4, the Estonian football community was rocked by the infamous Hendrik Pürg Scandal. The aforementioned player was not eligible to play, but the managerial staff of Kalju still sent Pürg on pitch. This eventually meant that Kalju U21 was given a technical loss and Welco headed to Esiliiga for 2017. season.

The cup season was not a success for Welco as for second year in a row the team was drawn to play against FC Flora in the 1/32-round. The electricians did not hold their own on the pitch and lost 0:8 at home.

Season 2017 
The first season at the second-highest tier in Estonian football system proved to be a too tough bone to chew for the Electricians. Even though season started with a good win against inner-county rivals FC Elva, the team was able to pick up only three wins with remaining 35 games. Not surprisingly, 19 points were not enough to keep JK Welco out from relegation. As winter 2017 were turbulent times for Estonian football – two Meistriliiga clubs FCI Tallinn and FC Levadia decided to merge and JK Sillamäe Kalev were relegated to II liiga due to financial troubles, JK Welco was still able to keep the spot in Esiliiga for 2018 season.

Previous League Seasons

Players

Current squad
As of 9 March, 2021

Managerial history

 Mirko Kikkamägi (2008–2010)
 Boris Hrabrov (2010–2012)
 Mikk Valtna (2012–2014)
 Siim Valtna (2014–2017)
 Yusuf Erdogan (2018– )

Managers
There have been four managers during the brief existence of Tartu JK Welco. Mirko Kikkamägi was the first head coach and under his two-year reign, the team achieved 3rd place in the IV Liiga in 2009.
Kikkamägi left the head coaching position to concentrate on his playing career and vacant job went to experienced Boris Hrabrov. Hrabrov brought new training methodology and added huge amount of professionalism to the squad of amateurs. Igor Antonov was the right-hand man of Hrabrov and served as consulting coach.
Club decided to change the head coach once again in the middle of 2012 season – due to the underperforming team and lack of enthusiasm on field. Club's chair decided to offer the vacant head coach position to iconic star-striker Mikk Valtna.
In the wake of 2014 season, club's chair decided to share head coaching position between Valtna brothers – after the successful debut in front of the Welco reserves, Siim Valtna was offered a position next to his brother Mikk as a coach of Welco's first team. After Mikk's decision to rejoin the black-white army of Welco on the field, Siim Valtna was the lone head coach of the first team.

Since the 2017 season in Esiliiga was unsuccessful for the black-and-white-army , the club's chair and Siim Valtna decided to part ways. The latter joined Meistriliiga side Tartu JK Tammeka as an assistant coach to Kaido Koppel – a former Welco first team goalkeeper and JK Welco found a new head coach from the newly-defunct FCI Tallinn – Yusuf Erdogan.

Crest and Colours

The original crest of JK Welco was developed in the middle of the first, 2008 season. In 2014, the club held a 1-month-long play-off style competition to find a new and fresh logo. Not surprisingly, the fans chose a logo which is very similar to the original Lauri Särak design. Current JK Welco goalie was again the author of the winning crest. The lightning bolt symbolizes the club's initial name Welco Elekter (elekter = electricity in Estonian).
Welco started playing in sky-blue shirt with black sleeves and all-black bottom. Kit producer was Hummel. During the 2010 season, club decided to change its appearance drastically and introduced distinctive black-on-white hoops design for shirt. Shorts remained black, but socks were changed to white. New kit was produced by Uhlsport.
In the wake of 2013 season, the club planned to develop an eye-catching new away jersey for both teams. The club used the help of its supporters to decide which kit was the most suitable to serve as a second jersey for the originally black-whites. The winning jersey was a combination of white base with red back (that symbolizes the flag of club's home town Tartu), and already "legendary" black stripes.
In 2016, the club once again held a competition with already well-known recipe to replace the iconic black on white hoops design. Overall 14 designers submitted 16 ideas for a new kit. The competition lasted for a week, gathered a whopping 1400 votes and had a total reach of 100,000 people on club's Facebook page. The competition was anonymous, but the winning design was not surprisingly again Särak's.

Home ground

During its first two seasons, JK Welco Elekter constantly changed its home grounds. Both Tamme staadion artificial turf and Põllu tn stadium natural grass pitch served as home grounds. In the beginning of 2010 season, JK Welco Elekter moved its home ground to Annelinna kunstmuruväljak, mainly due to renovation of Tamme artificial turf. In the beginning of 2013, the turf was so amortized that club decided to move back to the first home ground Tamme staadioni kunstmuruväljak. The club renovated the terraces for the spectators and the pitch now has a stand for up to 150 spectators.

Being promoted to the Esiliiga B meant, that the club had to move away from their beloved Tamme artificial pitch, since the regulations from the EJL did not allow to play on slightly undersized pitch. Thus, club moved their home games to main ground of Tamme stadium, which can seat up to 1,700 spectators. The games in the beginning and late of the season are being played in Annelinna kunstmuruväljak.

Honours
II Liiga
3rd: 2014
Runners-up: 2015
IV Liiga
Runners-up: 2010

References

Tartu JK Welco at Estonian Football Association

External links
Home page
Club's official on-line magazine Elektriarve
Official YouTube channel of JK Welco Elekter
Club's official Facebook page

Football clubs in Estonia
2008 establishments in Estonia
Sport in Tartu